Flaxman is a meteorite impact site in South Australia, Australia.

It is up to 10km long, though probably shorter, and is very narrow. Quartz rocks in the valley are affected by impact pressures and these deformation features are thought to be due to a ricochet event from a nearby impact at the Crawford crater, part of a proposed wider multiple impact. The impact date for the Flaxman site is as for Crawford, both estimated to be greater than 35 million years (probably Eocene). The affected rocks are exposed at the surface.

References

Further reading 
 Alley, A. F., Geological Survey of Southern Australia Bulletin, v.54, p. 151-218. 1995
 Haines, P. W., Impact Cratering and Distal Ejecta: The Australian Record. Australian Journal of Earth Sciences 52, P. 481 - 507. 2005
 Haines, P. W., Therriault, A.M. and Kelley, S.P., Evidence for a mid-Cenozoic (?), low angle multiple impacts in south Australia. Meteoritics and Planetary Science, v.34, supplement, p. 49. 1999

Impact craters of South Australia
Eocene impact craters
Eocene Australia